Sean Maguire (born 18 April 1976 in Ilford, London) is an English actor and singer who has been professionally making films, television shows and performing on stage for over 40 years. Originally from London, Sean started his career at age five starring alongside Sir Laurence Olivier in A Voyage Round My Father. He then rose to fame at age ten when he was cast in the BBC drama Grange Hill in the role of "Tegs" Ratcliffe in which he remained until 1991. After leaving Grange Hill, Maguire played Aidan Brosnan in EastEnders.

Maguire has appeared in several feature films and had success as a singer. He is known in the United States for his roles as Donovan Brink on the UPN sitcom Eve, and as Kyle Lendo in the CBS sitcom The Class. Maguire  appeared with Suranne Jones in Scott & Bailey as P.C. Sean McCartney and he played Robin Hood in ABC's Once Upon a Time
He also starred in The Magicians on Syfy, The 100 on the CW, NBC’s Timeless as Ian Fleming, in The 7.39 playing Ryan alongside Olivia Colman, in the Snapchat series "Action Royale" and in the science fiction podcast series "Electric Easy". In 2023, he starred in the CBS hit show S.W.A.T., playing Joe.

Career
At age seven, Maguire played one of the many children in the "Every Sperm is Sacred" musical number in the 1983 film Monty Python's The Meaning of Life. In 1991 he played Simon in the BBC children's drama "Dodgem". In 1993, Maguire joined the cast of the British soap opera EastEnders playing Aidan Brosnan, a young Irish footballer playing for fictional side Walford F.C. In 1994, he left the show to take a starring role in the BBC drama series Dangerfield, playing Marty Dangerfield. He has also appeared in Holby City and Sunburn.

Maguire then pursued a career in music, releasing three albums: his self-titled debut album in 1994, Spirit in 1996, and Greatest Hits in 1998. Maguire's biggest hit was Good Day, which reached number 12 in May 1996. During this time, Maguire appeared on the Childliners record The Gift of Christmas with acts such as the Backstreet Boys, E.Y.C., MN8, Deuce, Ultimate Kaos, Let Loose, East 17, Peter Andre, Michelle Gayle, Dannii Minogue and many more. Maguire announced his retirement from the music industry during his final performance at Maesteg Town Hall, part of his 'Chick N Bay 9T5 4EVA' tour . Emotional scenes were witnessed in the audience as Sean launched into his final song “Gone and Long Forgotten”.  Not content with acting on TV, he has branched out into films. In the early 1990s, he appeared in Waterland opposite Ethan Hawke and Jeremy Irons.

In 2001, Maguire played the title role in the TV-film Prince Charming opposite Bernadette Peters, Christina Applegate and Billy Connolly – with Martin Short as his assistant, Rodney. In 2005, he also made The Third Wish – which co-starred actors Jenna Mattison, Armand Assante, Betty White and James Avery. Maguire also appeared as "Euan" in the defunct WB Network sitcom Off Centre  with  Eddie Kaye Thomas and  Jason George.

Maguire played one of the main characters, Donovan Brink, on the television series Eve. He starred in the CBS sitcom The Class, playing gay character Kyle Lendo, but the show was cancelled in May 2007. He completed filming in 2006–2007 for an American comedy film LA Blues playing  a character called Jack Davis.

Maguire's film Meet the Spartans went to No. 1 in the US box office chart in 2008 and he starred in Mr Eleven on ITV1 in autumn 2008. Maguire also signed on to a guest spot in Cupid for ABC portraying an Irish musician.

Maguire played the lead role in Kröd Mändoon and the Flaming Sword of Fire, a comedy fantasy series in which he plays a "sensitive, but clueless freedom fighter". The show premiered in the United States on Comedy Central on 9 April 2009, in Canada on Citytv on 8 June, and in the United Kingdom on BBC Two on 11 June.

In the third season of ABC's Once Upon a Time, Maguire joined the show as Robin Hood, taking over the role from Tom Ellis. After recurring for two seasons, he was promoted to a series regular in June 2015, right before the start of the show's fifth season.

In 2023 Maguire recurred in 6th season of CBS’s S.W.A.T alongside Shemar Moore, playing Joe.

Personal life
Maguire is one of six siblings from the famous Irish dance family. His parents run the well-known Maguire–O'Shea school. Maguire himself danced competitively as a child. Maguire married police detective Tanya Flynn on 19 October 2012. They held a second wedding on 30 December 2014. The couple's first child, a son, was born in July 2015. Their second son was born in December 2017. Their  third child, a daughter, was born in September 2021.

Along with his wife, Maguire became a naturalized citizen of the United States on 23 September 2020.

Filmography

Film

Television

Video games

Discography

Albums

Singles

Stage work
Romeo and Juliet
Loot
Funny About Love

References

Bibliography
James, Bethan (2012) Someone To Love? (3rd ed). Bridgend: MadMike Publishers UK. p. 69

External links
 
 

1976 births
English male film actors
English male soap opera actors
English male singers
Living people
People from Ilford
Male actors from London
Singers from London
English people of Irish descent
21st-century English singers
21st-century British male singers
Naturalized citizens of the United States